The 2005 Taça de Angola was the 24th edition of the Taça de Angola, the second most important and the top knock-out football club competition following the Girabola. ASA beat Interclube 1–0 in the final to secure its third title.

Interclube, the runner-up, qualified to the CAF Confederation Cup since ASA, the winner, contested the CAF Champions League in their capacity as the Girabola runner-up.

Stadiums and locations

Championship bracket
The knockout rounds were played according to the following schedule:
 Apr 9 - May 18: preliminary rounds
 Jun 11 - 13: Round of 16
 Sep 21: Quarter-finals
 Oct 30: Semi-finals
 Nov 11: Final

Preliminary rounds

1/16 finals

Quarter-finals

Semi-finals

Final

See also
 2005 Girabola
 2006 Angola Super Cup
 2006 CAF Confederation Cup
 ASA players
 Interclube players

External links
 profile at rsssf.com

References

Angola Cup
2005 in Angolan football
Angola